Helmut Bracht (born 11 September 1929 in Dortmund; died 12 May 2011) was a German footballer who played as a midfielder for Westfalia Herne and Borussia Dortmund. He appeared 11 times for Dortmund in the inaugural Bundesliga season, and had a brief spell as manager of the club in 1970.

Honours
 German football championship: 1963

References

External links
 

1929 births
2011 deaths
German footballers
Association football midfielders
SC Westfalia Herne players
Borussia Dortmund players
Bundesliga players
Footballers from Dortmund